Heather Hope Royes (born 1943) is a Jamaican media consultant, HIV/AIDS consultant and poet.

Education and career
Royes earned a Ph.D. in mass communication from the University of Wisconsin. She has worked in the Jamaican government, including as cultural attaché in Mexico City in the 1980s.

She studies HIV/AIDS and, in 1993, published a pioneering study on "Jamaican Men and Same-Sex Activities." She has authored several papers and reports on the subject, including a 1999 UNESCO report on Jamaica's experience with HIV/AIDS.

Poetry
Royes has been writing poetry since the 1960s. Her poetry has been included in anthologies such as Heinemann's Jamaica Woman (1980) and Anthology of African and Caribbean Writing in English (1982), the Penguin Book of Caribbean Verse in English (1986), and the Oxford Book of Caribbean Verse (2005). In 1996 she published her first collection, The Caribbean Raj, consisting of about 30 poems divided into four sections. In 2001 she won the National Literary Competition and in 2005 she published a second volume, Days and Nights of the Blue Iguana, which included some poems from her first collection as well as new works.

References

External links
 Heather Royes at Peepal Tree Press

1943 births
Living people
HIV/AIDS researchers
20th-century Jamaican poets
21st-century Jamaican poets
Jamaican women writers
University of Wisconsin alumni